DHSC is a football club in the Ondiep district of Utrecht, Netherlands. The club plays in the 2022-23 Vierde Divisie.

History

VV DOS (1901–2004)

Voetbalvereniging Door Oefening Sterk, in short VV DOS, was established in 1901. The club won the national championship in 1958. In 1970 its professional branch merged with Velox and USV Elinkwijk to form FC Utrecht. The amateur section continued until 2004 when it merged with USV Holland to form DHC '04.

USV Holland (1917–2004) 
USV Holland, short for Utrechtse Sportvereniging Holland, was founded on 3 December 1917. They played at the Sportpark Thorbecke, Utrecht. From 1992 to 2000 the club played in the Hoofdklasse, at that time the highest amateur league. In 1993 and 1995 it became Sunday amateur champions. 

Its last year in the Hoofdklasse started a period of "free fall". USV Holland relegated 4 seasons in a row to end up in the Vierde Klasse.

DHC '04  (2004–2007) 
On 1 July 2004, USV Holland merged with the amateur section of VV DOS to become DHC '04.

DHSC (since 2007) 
An additional merger with Stichtse Boys in 2007 formed the DOS-Holland-Stichtse Boys-Combinatie (DHCS). The sites of USV Holland and DOS bordered each other on Thorbeckelaan. After the merger in 2007, both sites were demolished and a new Sportpark Thorbeckelaan was constructed for DHSC in the Ondiep district. This stadium has now been renamed Sportpark Wesley Sneijder, named after Wesley Sneijder, who grew up in Ondiep and played football at DOS.

In 2020, DHSC surprised by signing former professional players Mounir El Hamdaoui and Robert Guerain.

Managers

VV DOS 
 1944–1949 Jaap van der Leck
 195X-1957 Louis Pastoor
 1957–1959 Joseph Gruber
 1959–1961 Jaap van der Leck
 1961–1962 Joseph Gruber
 1962–1964 Wilhelm Kment
 1964–1965 Arie de Vroet
 1965–1966 Jovan Jovanovic
 – Tim van der Laan
 19??-1968 Jan de Lang
 1968–1969 Friedrich Donnenfeld
 1969–1970 Laszlo Zalai

References

External links
 Official website

 
 
Football clubs in the Netherlands
Association football clubs established in 2007
2007 establishments in the Netherlands
Football clubs in Utrecht (city)
1917 establishments in the Netherlands
Association football clubs established in 1917
Association football clubs established in 1901
Association football clubs disestablished in 2004
1901 establishments in the Netherlands
2004 disestablishments in the Netherlands